Grigor Dimitrov was the defending champion but decided not to participate.
Malek Jaziri won the title, defeating Mischa Zverev 4–6, 6–3, 6–3 in the final.

Seeds

Draw

Finals

Top half

Bottom half

References
 Main Draw
 Qualifying Draw

IPP Trophy - Singles
Geneva Open Challenger